The Centro Cultural la Azotea ("La Azotea" Cultural Center) is a cultural center and museum complex, located in the township and municipality of Jocotenango in Guatemala's Sacatepéquez Department.

The center comprises three separate museums, on the grounds of a coffee-growing estate or finca. The center contains a coffee museum, which illustrates the history of processing and marketing Coffee production in Guatemala, the Mayan Music Museum, also known as Casa K'ojom which houses Mayan musical instruments from pre-Columbian times, and the Rincon de Sacatepéquez Museum which has items related to traditional Guatemalan dress. The center also offers horse riding facilities and tours of the small coffee estate.

See also

 List of food and beverage museums

References

External links and references
Official site

Museums in Guatemala
Buildings and structures in Antigua Guatemala
Drink-related museums
Music museums
Fashion museums
Music organizations based in Guatemala